Panthera pardus spelaea, sometimes called the European Ice Age leopard or Late Pleistocene leopard, is a fossil leopard subspecies, which roamed Europe in the Late Pleistocene. The youngest known bone fragments date to about 32,000 to 26,000 years ago, and are similar in size to modern leopard bones.

Taxonomy 
Several fossil bones from the Early, Middle and Late Pleistocene were described and proposed as different leopard subspecies:

P. p. antiqua
P. p. begoueni
P. p. sickenbergi
P. p. vraonensis

These are now considered junior synonyms of P. p. spelaea.

Description
The European Ice Age leopard's skull was medium-long, and its characteristics are closest to the Panthera pardus tulliana subspecies. An apparent depiction of this leopard in the Chauvet Cave shows a coat pattern similar to that of modern leopards but with a unspotted belly, presumably white. Like other mammals, leopards from the cold glacial periods of the Late Pleistocene are usually larger than those from the warm interglacial phases. As in modern leopards, there was a strong sexual dimorphism, with males being larger than females.

Distribution

Pleistocene records
Bone fragments of P. p. spelaea were excavated in Switzerland, Italy, Spain, Germany, Great Britain, Poland and Greece.

The earliest known European Ice Age leopard fossils are dated to the late Early Pleistocene and estimated about 600,000 years old. They were excavated in the Grotte du Vallonnet in France and near Mauer in Germany.
The most complete skeleton of P. p. spelaea is known from Vjetrenica Cave in southern Bosnia and Herzegovina, where four leopard fossils were found. These are dated to the end of the Late Pleistocene, about 29,000–37,000 years ago. A cave painting of a leopard in the Chauvet Cave in southern France is dated to about 25,000–37,500 years old. The last European Ice Age leopards vanished from most parts of Europe about 24,000 years ago, just before the Last Glacial Maximum. In Germany, the European Ice Age leopard survived at least into the early Weichselian glaciation.

Holocene records
Subfossil leopard remains dated to the Holocene were excavated in Spain, Italy, and the Ponto-Mediterranean and Balkan regions.
The youngest subfossil leopard records in Europe were excavated in Ukraine and dated to the first century CE. Some subfossils were found in western Ukraine, close to the Carpathians; others in Olbia, on the northern coast of the Black Sea. The latter might belong to captive leopards, which could have been introduced from Asia Minor, since Olbia was a Greek colony at this time.

Modern leopards are still part of the present European fauna, being found in the wild in the North Caucasus. These belong to the Persian subspecies Panthera pardus tulliana, which also occurs in Anatolia. In 1889, a leopard was killed in the Greek island of Samos, and local folklore suggests that leopards have swum from Anatolia to Samos at different times in history.

Palaeobiology

Fossils of European Ice Age leopards in Europe are sometimes found in caves, where they apparently sought shelter or hid their prey. They generally preferred smaller caves, most likely because larger caves were usually occupied by larger predators such as cave bears, cave lions (P. spelaea), or humans. In European Ice Age caves, leopard bones are far rarer than those of lions, and all currently known fossils belong to adults, suggesting that they rarely, if ever, raised their cubs in caves. Where leopard remains are found in larger caves, they are often found in the cave's deeper recesses, as in Baumann's and Zoolithen Cave in Germany. It is not precisely known which prey species these leopards hunted, although they may have been similar to modern snow leopards, which prey on ibex, deer and wild boar. It is likely that leopards scavenged or occasionally killed cave bears during hibernation in their dens. During the cold phases, European Ice Age leopards occurred mainly in mountain or alpine boreal forests or in mountains above the treeline, and were not usually found in the lowland mammoth steppes.

See also

Panthera leo fossilis
Leopard subspecies
Chinese leopard
Zanzibar leopard

References

pardus spelaea
Pleistocene carnivorans
pardus spelaea
Late Pleistocene
Pleistocene mammals of Europe
Fossil taxa described in 1936
Fossils of Serbia